Thomas Victor Hall  (T. Victor Hall; May 30, 1879 – 1965) was an American illustrator, painter and sculptor.

Biography
Hall was born in Rising Sun, Indiana, 1879. He attended the Cincinnati Art Academy in the early 1900s where he studied with Frank Duveneck. Later he moved to  Peekskill, New York and pursued a career as an illustrator. In 1919 he joined Louis C. Pedlar, Inc. Pedlar initiated the Art Director's Club in 1920. Hall's work appeared in many magazines and books of the day, including the St. Nicholas magazine, The Argosy and The Youth's Companion Magazine.  Thomas Victor Hall's illustrations also appeared in All-Story Weekly', of which the most noteworthy is a series for Edgar Rice Burroughs' At The Earth's Core.
.

Hall was well known as a war illustrator. Robert Rotter and T. Victor Hall illustrated a book, written by various authors, The Best 100 True Stories Of World War II, H. Wise & Co., Inc. 1945. He published his own book in 1934, Pitman Publishing Corporation titled First Steps in Pictorial Composition''  Hall continued to work and show in New York throughout the 20th century. He died in 1965.

References

External links
Pearson's magazine, Volume 21, Issue 2
 Iturbide, a soldier of Mexico, By John Lewin McLeish
Munsey's magazine, Volume 38
 Pierrot wounded: and other poems, By Walter Adolphe Roberts
Printers' ink, Volume 107/ Photograph of T. Victor Hall
Posters of World War II

1879 births
1965 deaths
American illustrators
19th-century American painters
American male painters
20th-century American painters
Sculptors from New York (state)
People from Rising Sun, Indiana
People from Peekskill, New York
20th-century American sculptors
20th-century American male artists
19th-century American sculptors
19th-century American male artists
American male sculptors